The 1926–27 season was Blackpool F.C.'s 26th season (23rd consecutive) in the Football League. They competed in the 22-team Division Two, then the second tier of English football, finishing ninth.

Billy Tremelling was the club's top scorer, with 31 goals in total (thirty in the league and one in the FA Cup).

Season synopsis
An opening day defeat at Nottingham Forest was tempered by three straight victories.

A run of four consecutive defeats in October set the team back, but the fourteen victories that they put on the board during the remainder of the season helped them obtain a top-half finish.

The team sent Frank Buckley on his way to pastures new with a 5–0 home victory over Notts County on the final day. He became manager of Wolves the following season, remaining with them for seventeen years.

Table

Transfers

In

Out

Notes

References

Blackpool F.C.
Blackpool F.C. seasons